Captain John Overton Cone Orton  (30 August 1889 – May 1962) was a British screenwriter.

Early life and military service 
Orton was born in St. John's Wood, London in 1889 and lived in Larchmont, New York, USA for a brief period of his childhood. In 1909 he joined the Norfolk Regiment of the British Army. In 1918 Orton was awarded with the Military Cross, and was included in the 1919 Birthday Honours when he was awarded the Air Force Cross.

Film career 
He was a head of the story department for Gaumont-British and was known for writing comedy scripts for such stars as Will Hay, Jack Hulbert and Arthur Askey. He also wrote various dramas and directed five movies.  His final credit was as co-writer of fellow Gaumont alum Alfred Hitchcock's short war propaganda film Bon Voyage.

Select credits
 Creeping Shadows (1931)
 After the Ball (1932)
 Leave It to Smith (1933)
 Soldiers of the King (1933)
 Brown on Resolution (1935)
 Bulldog Jack (1935)
 Turn of the Tide (1935)
 The Flying Doctor (1936)
 Jack of All Trades (1936)
 Everything Is Thunder (1936)
 Non-Stop New York (1937)
 Oh, Mr Porter! (1937)
 Mr. Satan (1938)
 It's in the Blood (1938)
 Many Tanks Mr. Atkins (1938)
 Inspector Hornleigh Goes To It (1941)
 Cottage to Let (1941)
 Hi Gang! (1941)
 For Those in Peril (1944)
 Bon Voyage (1944)

References

External links

1889 births
1962 deaths
British male screenwriters
20th-century British screenwriters